Reshea LaNette Bristol (born February 10, 1978) is an American former professional basketball player. After starting her career in the WNBA with the Charlotte Sting in 2001, she went on to play fourteen years in Russia, Lithuania, Iceland, Switzerland, Turkey, the Czech Republic, Spain, and Stateside.

College career
Bristol played college basketball for the University of Arizona from 1996 to 2001. She finished her Arizona career in the No. 5 spot on the UA all-time scoring list, with 1,260 points.

Arizona statistics

Source

Professional career
Bristol was drafted by the Charlotte Sting with the 50th pick in the 2001 WNBA draft. She played for Dynamo in Moscow during the 2001-02 season.

In 2004, she signed with Keflavík of the Icelandic Úrvalsdeild. On 27 November 2004, she helped Keflavík win the Icelandic Company Cup after defeating ÍS in the Cup finals. In January 2005, she left the team due to a family emergency and missed the rest of the season. Despite an early exit, Bristol lead the league in assists, steals and three point percent and was named the Úrvalsdeild Foreign Player of the Year at the end of the season. She returned to Keflavík for the 2005–2006 season. In October 2005, she helped Keflavík win the annual Icelandic Super Cup after posting 14 points and 13 steals in a victory against Haukar. On 30 October 2005, Keflavík lost its first game with Bristol as a player. It had previously won all 22 games she had played in since 2004. In December 2005, Bristol left the club. Despite another early exit, she again led the league in assists and steals.

After spending the 2009-10 season with VS Prague in the Czech Women's Basketball League, she signed with Pabellon Ourense of the Spanish Liga Femenina 2 in January 2011. In 15 games, she averaged 10.5 points and 6.3 rebounds.

References

External links
WNBA statistics at Basketball-Reference
Spanish league statistics at competiciones.feb.es
Profile at EuroBasket.com

1978 births
Living people
Arizona Wildcats women's basketball players
American expatriate basketball people in Iceland
American women's basketball players
Charlotte Sting players
Reshea Bristol
Reshea Bristol
Forwards (basketball)
Guards (basketball)